John Walter Dinkelman (born 1961) is an American diplomat and government administrator who served as the acting Assistant Secretary of State for Administration from March 12, 2019 to August 20, 2019.

Early life and education 
The son of a member of the United States Army, Dinkelman was raised in the Southwestern United States. He earned a Bachelor of Business Administration from Brigham Young University in 1984.

Career 
After graduating from college, Dinkelman began his career in the private sector. He eventually joined the United States Foreign Service, and was first stationed in Turkey.

Dinkelman served as Chief of Staff in the Bureau of Administration starting in July 2018. His most recent overseas assignment was as Chargé d’Affaires at the U.S. Embassy in the Bahamas. He was also the consul in Nogales, Sonora.

References

Living people
Brigham Young University alumni
United States Department of State officials
Ambassadors of the United States to the Bahamas
American consuls
1961 births